Kurti is an Austronesian language spoken on the north coast of Manus Island in Papua New Guinea.

References

External links 
 Kaipuleohone's Robert Blust collection includes written materials on Kurti language and a word list

Manus languages
Languages of Manus Province